Mark Richards (July 15, 1760August 10, 1844) was an American politician. He served as a member of the United States House of Representatives from  Vermont and as the ninth lieutenant governor of Vermont.

Biography
Richards was born in Waterbury in the Connecticut Colony on July 15, 1760, and received limited schooling. In 1776, he enlisted for the American Revolution. A private in the Continental Army, he served for several years, including the Battle of Red Bank, the 1777-1778 winter encampment at Valley Forge, the Battle of Monmouth, and the Battle of Stony Point. Richards moved to Boston after the war to work in a general store. In 1796 he moved to Westminster, Vermont to open his own store.

Richards was a member of the Vermont House of Representatives from 1801 to 1805. He served as sheriff of Windham County from 1806 to 1810 and was a Presidential elector in 1812. He served on the Governor’s council from 1813 to 1816.

Richards was elected as a Democratic-Republican to the US House of Representatives, and served from 1817 to 1821 as a member of the 15th and 16th United States Congress. He served again in the Vermont House of Representatives from 1824 to 1826, in 1828 and from 1832 to 1834. He was the Lieutenant Governor of Vermont from 1830 to 1831.

Death
Richards died on August 10, 1844 in Westminster, Vermont and is interred in the Bradley tomb in the Old Westminster Cemetery in Westminster.

Family
In 1782, Richards married Ann Ruggles. Their daughter Sarah was the wife of William Czar Bradley.

References

External links
 

Information from the Vermont Archives
govtrack.us

The Political Graveyard

1760 births
1844 deaths
Members of the Vermont House of Representatives
Politicians from Waterbury, Connecticut
Lieutenant Governors of Vermont
People from Windham County, Vermont
18th-century American people
19th-century American politicians
Vermont sheriffs
Burials in Vermont
Democratic-Republican Party members of the United States House of Representatives from Vermont